Thomas Freeman may refer to:

Thomas Freeman (Australian cricketer) (1894–1965), Australian cricketer
Thomas Freeman (New Zealand cricketer) (1923–2003), New Zealand cricketer
Thomas Freeman (poet) (c. 1590–1630), English poet and epigrammatist
Thomas Freeman (pirate) (fl. 1655–1680), English buccaneer and privateer
Thomas Birch Freeman (1809–1890), missionary and colonial official
Tommy Freeman (boxer) (1904–1986), World Welterweight boxing champion
Thomas Freeman (debate coach) (1919–2020), lecturer and debate coach
Thomas J. Freeman (1827–1891), Justice of the Tennessee Supreme Court
Thomas Oscar Freeman, American murderer and murder victim
Thomas W. Freeman (1824–1865), American politician
Thomas Freeman (MP), in 1411, MP for Huntingdon
Tomás Freeman (fl. 2000s–2010s), Gaelic footballer
Jake Freeman (Thomas Jacob Freeman, born 1980), American hammer thrower

See also
Thomas Edwards-Freeman (1720s–1808), MP for Steyning
Thomas Friedman (disambiguation)